Queen Margaret's, York is a private boarding school and day school for girls age 11–18 in Escrick Park near York, England. The school was named after Queen Margaret, the Queen of Scotland from  1070 to 1093.

History

Queen Margaret's was established in 1901 in Scarborough by mainly Jane Leeke Latham of the Woodard Foundation. Woodard are an organisation committed to the establishment of boarding schools where teaching would be firmly based on the Christian religion. The founding head was Agnes Body who arrived from Lincoln with some of her former staff. In 1913, when ill health made her retire, it was said that QMS was known as "Miss Body's School".

Rosalind Fowler became the second Head and she supervised the evacuation of the School to Pitlochry during the First World War. Following another evacuation to Castle Howard in the Second World War, QM finally came to Escrick Park, six miles south of York, in 1949, where it remains today. Mrs Sue Baillie commenced her headship in September 2019, taking over from the previous Head Mrs Jessica Miles.

Today

Tatler Schools Guide 2011 stated: "QM is one of those all-girls country boarding schools that is quietly doing great things. Girls are playing lacrosse for the England under-19s, representing Great Britain at skiing, getting ace grades at A-level, performing for the National Youth Theatre and winning places at the London Contemporary Dance School."

Awards

Best Independent School for Student Wellbeing
In 2021 Queen Margaret’s was named as the winner in the Student Wellbeing category of the Independent Schools of The Year (ISOTY) Awards 2021, held by the Independent School Parent magazine. The award was chaired by Dr Helen Wright, International Education Adviser and past Vice Chair of the Independent Schools Council (ISC).

Dr Wright commented, "As we navigate our way through the challenges of the pandemic, I hope that the awards will provide schools an opportunity to take stock of all they have achieved in 2020-21 – often against the odds – and celebrate the amazing student experience they have continued to be able to provide... Great schools believe in their students’ ability to grow and develop and become the best of themselves. The UK’s independent schools are vibrant exciting places which, as the past year has demonstrated, are constantly evolving to respond to the needs of their individual students. These highly-regarded awards recognise and celebrate the amazing experiences and opportunities for students in independent schools across the UK and British schools overseas."

Performing Arts School of the Year 
In 2019 Queen Margaret's was shortlisted in the ‘Performing Arts School of the Year’ category in the Independent Schools of the Year Awards 2019. The Boarding Schools' Association noted, "QM has been shortlisted based on its ability to focus on girls’ individual talents as well as create group performances of the calibre and breadth you’d usually see in a much larger school. Recent individual successes include the School’s Head Girl winning the Ripon Cathedral Competition to promote new sacred music and a Year III violinist being invited to join the National Children’s Orchestra. Meanwhile, 45 girls were invited to perform in front of 1000 guests as the opening act at November’s White Rose Awards.The Escrick school has also been recognised for breaking down boundaries and proving that there is no area of Performing Arts that girls should not explore. Students adopt traditionally male roles both on and off stage - the backstage crew for their recent production of Blue Stockings was led seamlessly by an Upper Sixth girl. What’s more, QM has recently launched a Music Technology A Level challenging the issue that, in the industry, males outnumber females 5 to 1."

Boarding Innovation Award 
In 2018 Queen Margaret's was crowned winner of the Boarding Innovation Award at the Boarding Schools' Association Achievement Awards 2018. The Boarding Schools' Association (BSA) commented, "QM’s ‘Community Weekends’ have been recognised by the BSA as an outstanding example of boarding innovation. Introduced in September 2017, they were developed to stimulate further a thriving weekend life with the girls themselves taking charge and leading their organisation. With 12 Community Weekends held every year, each one is led by one of the School’s six vertical houses or other girl-led groups such as the International Council.As the only all girls’ full boarding school in the North of England, one of QM’s great strengths is its thriving boarding life which ensures full integration across the years. Girls take full responsibility for Community Weekends, consulting with all year groups to devise themes and content, which gives the girls the opportunity to develop essential soft skills such as communication, leadership and negotiation."

Best School Food Award
In 2015 Queen Margaret’s was named as the winner of the Best School Food award by Tatler magazine. The award recognised excellence in produce, menu ideas, presentation and taste.

Exam Results 
The pass rate at A Level in 2021 was 100% and 47% of all grades were at A*, with 78% at A*-A (nationally that figure was 44%).

The pass rate at GCSE in 2021 was 100%. One third (33%) of all GCSE results were at grade 9 and two thirds (67%) were at grades 9-7.

"The results provide a fantastic foundation for the next stage of each girl’s educational journey and demonstrate that QM girls are ready to 'take on the world'."

Inspection 
A 2019 inspection by the Independent Schools Inspectorate awarded Queen Margaret's its highest 'Excellent' rating across all categories inspected.

The report notes that “pupils develop outstanding study skills during their time at the School”, and how “boarding makes a very positive contribution to pupils’ overall academic success”.

Also noted was the personalised learning and development, where “the school does not expect them to fit a particular mould, but that they have the freedom to ‘find their own niche’ and flourish as individuals”.

The report also acknowledges the strong sense of community which is fostered at QM. It reinforces how seriously the older girls take their responsibility of acting as role models to the younger ones – the supportive roles they adopt often develop into lifelong friendships.

Dance
The School offers individual and group lessons in ballet, tap, hip-hop, contemporary and modern dance.

Music
Music plays an important role in life at QM with 45% of girls learning at least one instrument and over a quarter of those girls learning more than one instrument.

Sport
Sports facilities include an all-weather Astroturf, a sports hall, a competition-standard indoor swimming pool and a recreational outdoor pool, all-weather tennis courts, indoor squash courts, and a riding school adjacent to the main school campus. Main winter activities include: lacrosse, cross country, hockey, and netball. Summer sports include: athletics, cricket and rounders. Badminton, tennis, and squash are played at all levels.

Houses
Queen Margaret's has horizontal boarding houses for boarding, and vertical houses across all ages.

There are six vertical houses: Garry, Pitlochry, Duncan, QM Hall, School and St Aidan's. Each pupil and teacher is assigned to one of the houses and each house is run by a teacher as Head of House; two Upper Sixth girls are chosen to be House Captain and Deputy House Captain, and two or three Fourth Year (Year 10) girls are chosen as House Monitors. Inter-house competitions include those for sport, cookery and music.

Boarding
Around 80% of pupils are boarders. They are assigned to a boarding house based on year group and age. Each boarding house is supervised by a housemaster or housemistress who is assisted by the Head of Year.

Red House (Years 7–8, QM's Years I & II)
Atholl House (Years 9-10, QM's Year III-IV)
Winifred Holtby House, also known as "Winnie's" (Year 10, QM's Year IV)
Cloisters (Year 12, QM's LVI Lower Sixth)
The Cottages (Year 13, QM's UVI Upper Sixth)

Notable former pupils
See also :Category:People educated at Queen Margaret's School, York
Druie Bowett, artist
Sarah Connolly, opera Singer
Winifred Holtby, novelist and journalist
Joan Hall, politician
Ann Jellicoe, actor, theatre director and playwright
Katharine, Duchess of Kent
Dame Eleanor King, High Court Judge
Matilda Lowther, fashion model
Lady Alice Manners, fashion columnist
Lady Eliza Manners, socialite
Lady Violet Manners, fashion model
Suraya Marshall,  Air Officer Commanding of No. 2 Group RAF
Elizabeth Poston, Composer
Amanda Staveley, businesswoman

Heads
The Heads of Queen Margaret's are as follows:
Agnes Body (1901–1913)
Rosalind Fowler (1913–1928)
Mildred Burella-Taylor (1928–1934)
Lily Parsons (1934–1938)
Joyce Brown (1938–1960)
Barbara Snape (1960–1980)
Pat Valentine (1980–1983)
Colin McGarrigle (1983–1992)
Geoffrey Chapman (1993–2009)
Paul Silverwood (2009–2014)
Carole Cameron, Acting Head (2014–2015)
Jessica Miles (2015–2019)
Sue Baillie (2019– )

Arms

References

External links
Queen Margaret's School Website
Profile on the ISC website
ISI Inspection Report (PDF)
QM School Profile at The Good Schools Guide



Girls' schools in North Yorkshire
Private schools in North Yorkshire
Educational institutions established in 1901
Schools in Scarborough, North Yorkshire
1901 establishments in England
Church of England private schools in the Diocese of York
Boarding schools in the United Kingdom
Member schools of the Girls' Schools Association
Private schools in the East Riding of Yorkshire
Private schools in York
Boarding schools in North Yorkshire